The City of Thuringowa was a city and local government area in North Queensland, Australia covering the northern and western parts of what is now Townsville. The suburb of Thuringowa Central is the main business centre in this area.

Thuringowa was named after the German state of Thuringia where the shire's first chairman, John von Stieglitz, originated. Prior to its proclamation as a city on 1 January 1986, Thuringowa was a large rural shire, almost surrounding the City of Townsville.

In 2007 the Queensland Government recommended that the Thuringowa City Council and the Townsville City Council be merged as part of the review of councils and boundaries, with the merged entity to be referred to as the Townsville City Council and the city being called the New Townsville City. The transition was completed with the election of a new combined Council on 15 March 2008.

History

Early history
Prior to European settlement, the Nyawaygi Aboriginal people lived in the area around Thuringowa, Townsville and the Burdekin. The earliest European on record to live in Thuringowa was James Morrill whose boat washed ashore in 1846.

In 1860, the newly formed Queensland Government passed an act opening up the area to pastoral leases, and by 1861 there were many runs in Thuringowa. By 1865, Robert Towns and John Melton Black had purchased a number of properties throughout Thuringowa. In 1865 Robert Towns built a boiling down works – at the time, there was no facilities for shipping cattle or sheep, so in 1865 Andrew Ball and Mark Reid left Woodstock Station to find a harbour around the Cleveland Bay shores and the Town and port of Townsville was established at the mouth of Ross Creek.

Local government
The City of Thuringowa had its genesis in the Thuringowa Division, created on 11 November 1879 as one of 74 divisions around Queensland under the Divisional Boards Act 1879 with a population of 638.

On 16 January 1888, the Ayr Division was created out of Subdivision 3 of the Thuringowa Division in 1888 under the Divisional Boards Act 1887.

Considerable progress ensued over the following decades – by 1902, Thuringowa had 1,020 dwellings listed on its ratebooks. Early chairmen Arthur Bundock and Joseph Hodel were involved in construction of key architecture such as the Ross River Bridge, the bridge at the Causeway and the Stuart Creek Bridge. These roads and bridges were constructed to serve not only Thuringowa's rural base but also its residential subdivisions of Hermit Park, Mundingburra and Rosslea. Water reticulation and sanitary services were established in these suburbs and street lighting and beautification work was carried out along Charters Towers Road. Also during this period the Council's first administration building was constructed at the Causeway, near the intersection of Flinders Street West and Ingham Road.

Under the Local Authorities Act 1902, divisions were renamed shires, and on 31 March 1903, Thuringowa Division became the Shire of Thuringowa. The period up to 1918 was one of consolidation and minor works, rather than major projects.

In 1918, much of the Shire of Thuringowa's urban area was transferred to Townsville. This initially caused great hardship for the Shire, as its rate base had been reduced to 2,500 ratepayers and its council headquarters was outside the shire. The Council adopted a conservative approach to policy during this period that included not only the depression years of the 1930s but also during World War II, when the area became an important staging point and was host to significant numbers of military personnel.

From the 1960s onwards, significant suburban development and growth took place in the area and the Council was providing new facilities and infrastructure. In 1979, a new Shire administration centre was constructed, moving it back into the local area, and on 1 January 1986, the Shire of Thuringowa became the City of Thuringowa.

In 2007, the state government engaged in a programme of local government reform centred on amalgamating LGAs across Queensland. The Local Government Advisory Committee recommended that the Cities of Thuringowa and Townsville should be amalgamated into a new City of Townsville. Though it was the source of some controversy, the merger ultimately took place, with the City of Thuringowa ceasing to exist in March 2008. Les Tyrell, Thuringowa's mayor of 17 years, won against Townsville's mayor, 19-year incumbent Tony Mooney, in the mayoral election for the combined city.

Demographics
Thuringowa grew in population rapidly from the 1980s becoming one of the fastest-growing cities in Australia. The population had increased from 26,000 in 1986 to over 65,000 in 2007.

More:

Suburbs

The City of Thuringowa included the following settlements:

 Urban
 Alice River
 Bluewater (beach)
 Bohle
 Bohle Plains
 Bushland Beach (beach)
 Condon
 Deeragun
 Kelso
 Kirwan
 Pinnacles
 Rasmussen
 Thuringowa Central

 Rural
 Balgal Beach (beach)
 Black River
 Bluewater Park
 Burdell (beach)
 Jensen
 Mount Low (beach)
 Mutarnee
 Paluma
 Rollingstone
 Saunders Beach (beach)
 Shaw
 Toolakea (beach)
 Toomulla (beach)
 Yabulu (beach)

Municipal leaders 
The following is a list of chairmen and mayors of the Thuringowa Division, Shire of Thuringowa and City of Thuringowa from 1880 until 2008:

References

Further reading

External links
 Former Thuringowa City Council

 More history of Thuringowa, including searchable historical image collection – from Thuringowa Library Heritage Services

Former local government areas of Queensland
Townsville
2008 disestablishments in Australia
Populated places disestablished in 2008
Queensland in World War II